Dichloro(1,5-cyclooctadiene)palladium is the organopalladium compound with the formula PdCl2(C8H12) where C8H12 is cycloocta-1,5-diene (cod) or abbreviated PdCl2(cod). It is a yellow solid that is soluble in chloroform.  According to X-ray crystallography, the Pd center is square planar.

See also
Dichloro(cycloocta-1,5-diene)platinum(II)

References

Palladium compounds
Homogeneous catalysis
Chloro complexes
Cyclooctadiene complexes